The electoral system in Sweden is proportional. Of the 349 seats in the national diet, the unicameral Riksdag, 310 are fixed constituency seats allocated to constituencies in relation to the number of people entitled to vote in each constituency. The remaining 39 leveling seats are used to correct the deviations from proportional national distribution that may arise when allocating the fixed constituency seats. There is a constraint in the system that means that only a party that has received at least four per cent of the votes in the whole country participates in the distribution of seats. However, a party that has received at least twelve per cent of the votes in a constituency participates in the distribution of the fixed constituency seats in that constituency.

Apportionment of fixed constituency seats

Notes 

Riksdag
Numbering in politics